Nazareno Colombo (born 20 March 1999) is an Argentine professional footballer who plays as a centre-back for Defensa y Justicia.

Club career
Colombo came through the youth system of Estudiantes, initially joining in 2010. After penning his first professional contract on 11 July 2019, the centre-back made his first-team debut nine days later in a Copa Argentina victory in Cutral Có over Mitre; appearing for the full duration versus the Primera B Nacional outfit.

Defensa y Justicia

International career
In 2018, Colombo represented Argentina at the L'Alcúdia International Tournament in Spain. He made five appearances as they won the trophy. In the months prior, Colombo had trained against the seniors at the 2018 FIFA World Cup in Russia. In January 2020 he was called up to the U23 national team of Argentina to take part in the 2020 CONMEBOL Pre-Olympic Tournament in Colombia, replacing Lautaro Valenti. He started the last group stage's match against Venezuela and netted a goal.

In late August 2021, Colombo joined Defensa y Justicia on a dry loan the rest of the year. On 17 January 2022, Defensa bought Colombo free from Estudiantes for a fee around 1,250,000 dollars for 50% of his pass, with the player signing a deal until the end of 2025.

Personal life
Colombo is the son of former professional footballer Leonardo Colombo.

Career statistics
.

Honours
Argentina U20
L'Alcúdia International Tournament: 2018

Argentina U23
Pre-Olympic Tournament: 2020

References

External links

1999 births
Living people
People from Quilmes
Argentine people of Italian descent
Argentine footballers
Argentina youth international footballers
Argentina under-20 international footballers
Association football defenders
Estudiantes de La Plata footballers
Defensa y Justicia footballers
Sportspeople from Buenos Aires Province